James Morice (1539–1597) was an English politician.

He was born 1539, the eldest son of William Morice of Chipping Ongar by Anne Isaac of Kent and  educated at the Middle Temple.

He was chosen as the Member of Parliament for Wareham in 1563. Later he was elected to serve for Colchester, Essex, for the parliaments of 1584, 1586, 1589, and 1593.

He married Elizabeth, the daughter of George Medley of Tilty Abbey, Essex; they had four sons, including his heir John, and three daughters.

References
Oxford Dictionary of National Biography, Morice, James (1539–1597), lawyer by Christopher W. Brooks.
History of Parliament MORICE, James (1539-97), of Chipping Ongar, Essex

1539 births
1597 deaths
English MPs 1563–1567
English MPs 1584–1585
English MPs 1586–1587
English MPs 1589
English MPs 1593